The 1936 All-Ireland Senior Camogie Championship Final was the fifth All-Ireland Final and the deciding match of the 1936 All-Ireland Senior Camogie Championship, an inter-county camogie tournament for the top teams in Ireland.

Cork went 3-1 to 0-0 up early on and Louth never looked likely to prevent a three-in-a-row. K. Johnston, N. McDonnell and N. Hanratty hit goals for Louth, narrowing the gap to five points (4-4 to 3-2, but Cork won anyway.

References

All-Ireland Senior Camogie Championship Final
All-Ireland Senior Camogie Championship Final, 1936
All-Ireland Senior Camogie Championship Final
All-Ireland Senior Camogie Championship Finals
Cork county camogie team matches